The 2011 Crusaders Rugby League season was the club's second year in the Super League. Despite going into administration at the end of 2010, the club was readmitted to the Super League for the 2011 season, but was docked four points for breaching insolvency rules. Crusaders struggled throughout the season, and finished bottom of the league.

In July 2011, Crusaders announced that they would not be competing in the Super League from next season after withdrawing their application due to financial concerns.

Super League table

2011 squad
Source:

2011 Transfers

In

Out

References

Crusaders Rugby League seasons
Crusaders Rugby League season
2011 in Welsh rugby league